Dave de Hugard (born 1945) is an Australian musician and folklorist. He has been described as "the country's foremost interpreter of the 'old bush songs'". He was nominated for the 1987 ARIA Awards for Best Indigenous Release.

Discography
Freedom on the wallaby : Australian bush songs (1970)
On the steps of the dole office door : oral images of the Great Depression in Australia. (1977) - Larrikin
The Magpie in the Wattle (1986) - Larrikin
Magpie morning (1993) - Sandstock Music
Songs of the Wallaby Track (2003) - Folk Alliance Australia

with The Wild Colonials
Euabalong Ball (1971) - EMI

References

External links
Dave de Hugard collection (sound recording) listing at the National Library of Australia

Australian musicians
Living people
1945 births